"I'm Eighteen" is a song by rock band Alice Cooper, first released as a single in November 1970 backed with "Is It My Body".  It was the band's first top-forty success—peaking at number 21—and convinced Warner Bros. that Alice Cooper had the commercial potential to release an album.  The song and its B-side feature on the band's first major-label album Love It to Death (1971).

A plodding, arpeggiated guitar riff and abrasive, raspy vocal performance power the anthem. The lyrics describe the anxiety that comes with being "in the middle" of childhood and adulthood.  It began as an eight-minute jam that young Canadian producer Bob Ezrin persuaded the band into tightening into a tight three-minute rocker.

The song was the band's breakthrough, and left a considerable influence on hard rock, punk, and heavy metal.  Joey Ramone wrote his first song for the Ramones based on the chords to "I'm Eighteen", and John Lydon auditioned for the Sex Pistols by miming to the song.  Bands such as thrash metalers Anthrax have covered the song, and Kiss settled out of court for plagiarism of the song over the 1998 track "Dreamin.

Description

The lumbering, distorted, and arpeggiated main guitar riff is in E minor and drives the dark, aggressive song.  Glen Buxton and Michael Bruce play similar rhythm guitar parts with slight differences; both used Gibson SG guitars.  A pair of acoustic guitars subtly round out the sound—one filtered through a Leslie speaker.  Dennis Dunaway plays a moving, melodic bass part rather than taking the typical rock strategy of holding to the root.  The performance also features some distorted lead guitar, vocalist Cooper on harmonica during the intro, and an organ that joins the band for the closing chord.

Cooper's sings with raspy vocals of the existential anguish of being at the cusp of adulthood, decrying in each verse being "in the middle"—"of life" or "of doubt".  The chorus switches to a series of crashing power chords building from A, the vocals proclaiming: "I'm eighteen / And I don't know what I want ... I gotta get out of this place / I'll go runnin' in outer space".  The song turns around at the conclusion with an embrace of those things that had been such anguish: "I'm eighteen and I like it!"  There are no harmonies or doubling in the vocals.

Background, production, and release

The Alice Cooper band formed in the mid-1960s and adopted its name in 1968, presenting an origin story that it came from a 17th-century witch whose name they learned from a session with a ouija board.  The group's first two albums, Pretties for You (1969) and Easy Action (1970), appeared on Frank Zappa's Straight Records label, and failed to find an audience.  The band relocated to Detroit and found itself in the midst of a music scene populated with the hard-driving rock of the MC5, the stage-diving Iggy Pop with the Stooges, and the theatricality of George Clinton's Parliament and Funkadelic.  The Alice Cooper band incorporated these influences into a tight hard-rock sound coupled with an outrageous, theatrical live show.  Zappa sold Straight Records to Warner Bros. in 1970 for $50,000.

While at the Strawberry Fields Festival in Canada in April 1970, band manager Shep Gordon contacted producer Jack Richardson, who sent nineteen-year-old Bob Ezrin in his place.  Ezrin initially turned down working with the band, but changed his mind when he saw them perform at Max's Kansas City in New York City the following October.  Ezrin was impressed with the band's audience-participation rock-theater performance and the cult-like devotion of the band's fans, who dressed up and knew the lyrics and actions to the music.  Ezrin returned to Toronto to convince Richardson to take on the band; Richardson did not want to work directly with such a group but agreed on condition that Ezrin took the lead.

The band and Bob Ezrin did pre-production for the album in Pontiac, Michigan, in November and December 1970.  Ezrin, with his classical and folk background, attempted to have the band tighten its loosely structured songs. The band resisted at first, but came to see things Ezrin's way, and ten to twelve hours a day of rehearsal resulted in a tight set of hard-rocking songs with little of the psychedelic freak-rock aesthetic of the first two albums.  According to Cooper, Ezrin "ironed the songs out note by note, giving them coloring, personality", including cutting down "I'm Eighteen" from an eight-minute jam to a tight three-minute rocker, a song whose aggressive chorus he misheard at first as "I'm Edgy".

"I'm Eighteen" was a sixteen-track recording made at RCA Mid-American Recording Center in Chicago.  Ezrin found it a challenge to capture Cooper's raspy vocals with standard techniques; he settled on using a Shure SM57 microphone with high compression and judicious addition of treble and midrange equalization.

Release, reception, and legacy

In November 1970  the group released a single of "I'm Eighteen" (shown on the label simply as "Eighteen") backed with "Is It My Body", and Warner Bros. agreed that if it sold well the group could go forward with an album.  The band posed as fans and made hundreds of calls to radio stations to request the song, and Gordon is said to have paid others a dollar per radio request.  Soon the song was on the airwaves across the country—even on mainstream AM radio—and peaked at number 21 on the charts.  In Canada it broke the top ten, peaking at number 7.  The success convinced Warner to allow the band to go ahead with Love It to Death, released March 1971.  The band's next single was "Caught in a Dream" backed with "Hallowed Be My Name" in May 1971.

The band played "I'm Eighteen" live on the German television show Beat-Club in 1972.  Cooper appeared on the floor in a Wonder Woman T-shirt gripping a whiskey bottle.  During an extended intro, Cooper declares "I ain't twenty-one", then "twenty-two" and on until "twenty-five" before the band delivers an aggressive, heavily distorted performance of the song.

Vocalist Joey Ramone based the first song by New York punk band the Ramones, "I Don't Care", on the chords of the main riff to "I'm Eighteen".  John Lydon wrote the song "Seventeen" on the Sex Pistols album Never Mind the Bollocks in response to "I'm Eighteen", and is said to have auditioned for the Sex Pistols by miming to an Alice Cooper song—most frequently reported as "I'm Eighteen".

Thrash metal band Anthrax included a cover of "I'm Eighteen" on its debut album Fistful of Metal (1984).  Creed provided a cover version of the song for the soundtrack to the 1998 teen horror movie The Faculty.  The song "Dreamin on the 1998 Kiss album Psycho Circus bears such a resemblance to "I'm Eighteen" that a month after the album's release Cooper's publisher filed a plagiarism suit, settled out of court in Cooper's favor.

"I'm Eighteen" was selected by the Rock and Roll Hall of Fame as one of the 500 Songs that Shaped Rock and Roll. It was voted  in Detroit's 100 Greatest Songs, a 2016 Detroit Free Press poll. The song ranked  on VH1's 40 Greatest Metal Songs in 2006.

References

Works cited

 
 
 
 
 
 
 
 
 
 
 
 
 
 
 
 
 
 

 
 
 
 
 
 
 
 

Songs about teenagers
1970 singles
Alice Cooper songs
Songs written by Dennis Dunaway
Songs written by Alice Cooper
Song recordings produced by Bob Ezrin
Songs written by Michael Owen Bruce
1970 songs
Warner Records singles